Rotta is a village and a former municipality in Wittenberg district in Saxony-Anhalt, Germany. Since 1 January 2010, it is part of the town Kemberg.

Geography 
Rotta lies about 15 km southwest of Lutherstadt Wittenberg on the edge of the Düben Heath Nature Park.

Subdivisions
Rotta has three of these: Reuden, Gniest and Kolonie Gniest.

History 
Rotta had its first documentary mention in 1323.

Economy and transportation
Rotta is about 2 km from both Federal Highway (Bundesstraße) B 2 and B 100.

External links 

Verwaltungsgemeinschaft's website

Former municipalities in Saxony-Anhalt
Kemberg